Landsale is P-Model's second album.

Overview
Landsale bears similarity to the debut In A Model Room, with sarcastic lyrics to the background of a nervous and energetic sound. The songs are more aggressive, with the exception of opening track "Ohayo".

Landsale went on to become the band's only chart-topping album. Hirasawa re-recorded most of the album in 1999 as Virtual Live-2 [P-Model Live at Shibuya Nylon 100% 1980].

Track listing

Personnel
 P-Model - Production, Arrangements
Susumu Hirasawa - Lead vocals, Backing vocals on "Touch Me", Guitar, Synthesizer
Yasumi Tanaka - Combo organ, Synthesizers, Sequencer, Piano on "Ohayo", Backing vocals
Sadatoshi Tainaka - Drums, Percussion
Katsuhiko Akiyama  - Bass, Synth bass, Piano on "Na-Ka-Yo-Shi", Backing vocals, Lead vocals on "Touch Me"

Guest musicians & production
Noriko Amano Group - Strings on "Ohayo"
Makoto Furukawa - Engineering, Mixing
Michio Kawamata & Shunichi Kusayanagi - Assistant Engineering

 Staff
Tomonari Sassa - Direction
Yūichi Hirasawa (credited as "You Hirasawa") - Art director
Takuya Usami & Hideki Namai - Photography
Model House - Productive Management
Thanks to: 21st Wonderland, Yūkun, Āchan, Masakazu Iwanari & many others

Release history

"Daijobu" is included on the Burst! New Wave 1980 various artists compilation.
The album's single was reissued on CD on a paper sleeve to replicate its original packaging with the band's other Warner-Pioneer released singles as part of the Tower Records exclusive Warner Years Singles Box box set in 2012.

References

External links
 
 Landsale at SS RECORDINGS Official Site

1980 albums
P-Model albums
Japanese-language albums
Warner Music Japan albums